The 1960 Cincinnati Bearcats football team represented University of Cincinnati during the 1960 NCAA University Division football season. The Bearcats, led by first-year head coach George Blackburn, participated in the Missouri Valley Conference (MVC) and played their home games at Nippert Stadium.

Schedule

References

Cincinnati
Cincinnati Bearcats football seasons
Cincinnati Bearcats football